Shahid Mahboob (Urdu: شاہد محبوب; born 25 August 1962) is a Pakistani cricket coach and former cricketer who played in one Test match and ten One Day Internationals from 1982 to 1989, including at the 1983 Cricket World Cup.

Education
He was educated at the St. Patrick's High School, Karachi.

References 

1962 births
Living people
Pakistan Test cricketers
Pakistan One Day International cricketers
Cricketers at the 1983 Cricket World Cup
Pakistani cricketers
Industrial Development Bank of Pakistan cricketers
Allied Bank Limited cricketers
Karachi Whites cricketers
Quetta cricketers
Karachi cricketers
Pakistan Automobiles Corporation cricketers
Rawalpindi cricketers
Islamabad cricketers
Karachi Blues cricketers
Cricketers from Karachi
St. Patrick's High School, Karachi alumni
Pakistani cricket coaches